The final of the men's triple jump event at the 1992 Summer Olympics in Barcelona, Spain was held on August 3, 1992. There were 47 participating athletes from 32 nations, with two qualifying groups. The maximum number of athletes per nation had been set at 3 since the 1930 Olympic Congress. Mike Conley Sr. set a new Olympic record with 17.63 m. He also jumped 18.17 m which would also improve the standing world record, but this jump had wind assistance 2.1 m/s. The top twelve and ties, and all those reaching 17.00 metres advanced to the final. The qualification round was held on August 1, 1992. Conley's gold was the United States's fifth victory in the men's triple jump, surpassing the Soviet Union's four. Conley was the 11th man to win two medals in the event, and the first to do so in non-consecutive Games. Frank Rutherford's bronze was the first medal for the Bahamas in the event.

Background

This was the 22nd appearance of the event, which is one of 12 athletics events to have been held at every Summer Olympics. The returning finalists from the 1988 Games were gold medalist Khristo Markov of Bulgaria, bronze medalist Aleksandr Kovalenko of the Soviet Union/Unified Team, fifth-place finisher Charles Simpkins of the United States, tenth-place finisher Norbert Elliott of the Bahamas, and twelfth-place finisher Norifumi Yamashita of Japan. American Mike Conley Sr., silver medalist in 1984 but who had not made the team in 1988, returned and was favored. Leonid Voloshin, on the Unified Team, was the biggest challenger.

Barbados, Honduras, Israel, Latvia, Swaziland, and Zimbabwe each made their first appearance in the event; some former Soviet republics appeared as the Unified Team. The United States competed for the 21st time, having missed only the boycotted 1980 Games.

Competition format

The competition used the two-round format introduced in 1936. In the qualifying round, each jumper received three attempts to reach the qualifying distance of 17.00 metres; if fewer than 12 men did so, the top 12 (including all those tied) would advance. In the final round, each athlete had three jumps; the top eight received an additional three jumps, with the best of the six to count.

Records

Prior to the competition, the existing world and Olympic records were as follows.

Mike Conley Sr. broke the Olympic record with a jump of 17.63 metres in the second round of the final. In the sixth round, he jumped 18.17 metres, which would have been a new world record, but the 2.1 metres per second wind assistance was just slightly over the limit of 2.0 metres per second required for record consideration.

The following national records were set during the competition:

Schedule

All times are Central European Summer Time (UTC+2)

Results

Qualifying

Final

See also
 1990 Men's European Championships Triple Jump
 1991 Men's World Championships Triple Jump
 1993 Men's World Championships Triple Jump

References

External links
 Official Report
 Results

T
Triple jump at the Olympics
Men's events at the 1992 Summer Olympics